Suite 16 may refer to:

 Suite 16 (album)
 Suite 16 (film)
 Suite 16 (band), Norwegian boy band